The kurash competitions at the 2019 Southeast Asian Games in Philippines were held at the LausGroup Event Centre in San Fernando, Pampanga between 1 and 2 December 2019.

Medal table

Medalists

Men

Women

References

External links
 

2019 Southeast Asian Games events